The  are a group of 41 islands that belong to Yamaguchi and Ehime Prefectures in the Inland Sea. The largest by far is Suō-Ōshima, or Yashiro Island.

List of islands
The islands are categorized into the following groups:
 Heigun-tō, 平郡島
 Suō Oshima Islands
 Suō-Ōshima, or Yashiro Island
 Nasake-jima, 情島
 Okikamuro Island, # 沖家室島
 3 others
 5 in the Kumage group
 Kutsuna Islands (29)
 Nakashima Island (Ehime)
 Kuwaji Island, 津和地島
 Newaji Island, 怒和島
 Futakami Island, 二神島
 Muzuki Island, 睦月島
 Nogutsuna Island, 野忽那島
 Yuri Island, 由利島
 Tsurushi Island, 釣島 (uninhabited)
 Gogo Island, 興居島 (uninhabited)
 Hashima Island (Yamaguchi), 端島 (山口県) (uninhabited)
 Hashira Island, 柱島
 18 more uninhabited

References

Archipelagoes of Japan
Islands of Ehime Prefecture
Islands of Yamaguchi Prefecture
Japanese archipelago
Archipelagoes of the Pacific Ocean